The 2016 Guia Race of Macau was the eleventh and final round of the 2016 TCR International Series season as well as the fifth and final round of the 2016 TCR Asia Series season. It took place on 20 November at the Guia Circuit.

Stefano Comini won the first race, driving a Volkswagen Golf GTI TCR and Tiago Monteiro gained the second one, driving a Honda Civic TCR.

Success Ballast
Due to the results obtained in the previous round, James Nash received +30 kg, Roberto Colciago +20 kg and Kevin Gleason +10 kg. Nevertheless, Colciago and Gleason did not take part at this event, so they did not take the ballast.

In addition, the Balance of Performance was reviewed for this round: all TCR cars were given a 20 kg weight break, bringing them back to their base weights. This was applied in an attempt to balance them with the CTCC cars entered for the event.

Classification

Qualifying

Notes:
 – Rafaël Galiana, Andrea Belicchi, Lou Hon Kei, Kevin Tse and  Mikhail Grachev were moved to the back of the grid for having not set a time within the 107% limit. The grid order was decided by the free practice combined classification.
 – William Lok, Terence Tse, William O'Brien, Kenneth Ma and Douglas Khoo failed to set a lap time within 107% of the fastest time during the weekend. As a result, these drivers failed to qualify for the race.

Race 1

Race 2

Standings after the event

Drivers' Championship standings

Model of the Year standings

Teams' Championship standings

 Note: Only the top five positions are included for both sets of drivers' standings.

See also
2016 Macau Grand Prix
2016 FIA GT World Cup

References

External links
TCR International Series official website

Macau
TCR International Series
TCR International Series, Macau
TCR International Series